Gondogoro Pass is a 5585 meter high mountain pass in the Baltistan region of Pakistan 25 km south of the world's second-highest peak, K2.  It connects the Gondogoro Glacier on the southwest and the Vigne Glacier on the northeast. On the southwest side, the route down from the pass descends into the Hushe village which contains the uppermost settlements of the Ghangche District.  
Most climbers and trekkers approach from the northeast side.  In 1986, a route was established that connects Concordia in the upper Baltoro Glacier to the Hushe Valley over the Gondogoro Pass.  Since then, the pass has attracted trekkers and climbers. This pass has one of the most overwhelming mountain panoramas, with all of the Karakoram's 8000m peaks close at hand.

The Gondogoro La, though popular with trekkers, involves Class 4 climbing with crampons. The northeast side has up to 50-degree snow slopes with avalanche danger requiring fixed ropes. The southwest side is a longer, continuous 50-degree slope with rock-fall and avalanche danger that requires fixing as much as 300 meters of rope.
Yahya Aziz, aged 10 from Lahore Pakistan crossed the Gondogoro La on July 17, 2021, becoming the youngest to cross.

When to visit
The pass is easier to cross earlier in the season and can be attempted as early as the last three or four days in June; earlier and one is likely to be the first party of the season to break the trail. By August, objective dangers from crevasses, avalanches and rock fall increase substantially as the snow cover begins to melt.

The pass may be approached either from the Askole village up the Baltoro Glacier valley to Concordia and then Ali Camp on Vigne Glacier northeast of the pass, or via the Hushe Valley (past the mouths of the Charakusa Glacier valley on the east and the Masherbrum glacier valley on the northwest, and passing just west of Laila Peak.

Even though the ascending and descending sides of the pass have fixed dynamic ropes, crossing this pass requires judgement, fitness, prior acclimatisation, and basic mountaineering skills. High altitude local climbers remain near the top of the pass during the climbing season to maintain the ropes and assist.

Notable features

Numerous climbers regard this region as having some of the finest mountain scenery. Gondogoro Pass overlooks to the northeast what Galen Rowell termed the "Throne Room of the Mountain Gods."  Apart from dozens more, one can see the following peaks from the pass:
 K2(Choghori)
 Broad Peak
 Masherbrum
 Laila Peak
 Gasherbrum I
 Gasherbrum II
 Gasherbrum III
 Gasherbrum IV
 Trinity Peak

See also
Gondogoro Glacier
Laila Peak (Hushe Valley)

References

External links

Mountain passes of Gilgit-Baltistan